Brian Smith (born September 19, 1990) is a former American football cornerback. He went undrafted during the 2013 NFL Draft, and signed with the New York Jets as an undrafted free agent. He played college football at Virginia Union University.

Life and career

High school career 
He attended Churchland High School in Portsmouth, Virginia, where he was named First-team All-Eastern District as a kick returner.

College career 
Smith continued his football career at Virginia Union University.

Professional career

New York Jets 
On April 30, 2013, Smith signed as an undrafted free agent with the New York Jets, but failed to make the team's roster.

Wyoming Cavalry 
Smith played the 2014 season with the Wyoming Cavalry of the Indoor Football League (IFL).

Richmond Raiders 
Smith signed with the Richmond Raiders of the Professional Indoor Football League (PIFL) for the 2015 season. He set a PIFL record with 4 interceptions in a single game.

Orlando Predators 
On May 27, 2015, Smith was assigned to the Orlando Predators of the Arena Football League (AFL). On August 3, 2015, Smith was placed on reassignment. On October 9, 2015, Smith had his rookie option picked up by the Predators. On May 17, 2016, Smith was assigned to the Predators. On July 5, 2016, Smith was placed on reassignment.

Washington Valor 
On March 21, 2017, Smith was assigned to the Washington Valor of the AFL. He was placed on recallable reassignment on March 25, 2017. Smith was assigned to the Valor again on April 5, 2017. On May 12, 2017, Smith was placed on reassignment. On June 28, 2017, Smith was assigned to the Valor once again. On July 28, 2017, Smith was placed on reassignment. On August 2, 2017, Smith was assigned to the Valor once again.

References

External links 
 Virginia Union Panthers bio

1990 births
Living people
Players of American football from Virginia
American football cornerbacks
Virginia Union Panthers football players
Wyoming Cavalry players
Tri-Cities Fever players
Richmond Raiders players
Orlando Predators players
Washington Valor players